The Antelope Range is a mountain range in Pershing County, Nevada.

The range was so named on account of antelope in the area.

References 

Mountain ranges of Pershing County, Nevada
Mountain ranges of Nevada